Karene is a district in the North West Province, Sierra Leone. Karine is one of the sixteen districts that make up the Republic of Sierra Leone. The capital and largest city of Karine District is Kamakwie Karine along with Falaba District are the two new districts of Sierra Leone formed in December 2017, after they were ratified by the Sierra Leone Parliament in the government of former president Ernest Bai Koroma

The major economic activity in Karine is farming. The Temne people is the predominant majority ethnic group in Karine.

References 

North West Province, Sierra Leone
States and territories established in 2017
2017 establishments in Sierra Leone